Canadian Mosaic is a book by John Murray Gibbon, published in 1938. Gibbon's book, the full title of which is Canadian Mosaic: The Making of a Northern Nation, heralded a new way of thinking about immigrants that was to shape Canadian immigration policy in the latter part of the 20th century. The idea of a mosaic, in which each cultural group retained a distinct identity and still contributed to the nation as a whole, was in contrast to the melting pot, a popular metaphor for the more assimilationist American approach to immigration.

The idea of a mosaic of cultures forming a nation was adopted by Canadian sociologist John Porter in his study of social class, entitled Vertical Mosaic: An Analysis of Social Class and Power in Canada. The mosaic theme became a part of Canadian multiculturalism policy in the 1970s, which envisioned Canada as a "cultural mosaic".

References
Gibbon, J. 1938. Canadian Mosaic: The Making of a Northern Nation. Toronto: McClelland & Stewart.
Henderson, S. 2005. "'While there is Still Time...': J. Murray Gibbon and the Spectacle of Difference in Three CPR Folk Festivals, 1928–1931." Journal of Canadian Studies, Winter 2005.

Books about immigration in Canada
Sociology books
Canadian non-fiction books
1938 non-fiction books
Books about Canada
Governor General's Award-winning non-fiction books